

Æcci or Acca of Dunwich, was a medieval bishop of Dunwich. He was consecrated after 672, however, his death or end of episcopate is not known.

References

External links
 

Bishops of Dunwich (ancient)
8th-century English bishops